Thomas Acton Nash, Sr. (November 21, 1905 – August 24, 1972) was an American football end for the Green Bay Packers and Brooklyn Dodgers of the National Football League (NFL) from 1928 to 1934.

Early years
Tom Nash, Sr. was born in Lincoln County, Georgia and grew up in Washington, Georgia.

College career
Nash played college football on the 1925, 1926, and 1927 University of Georgia football teams, including the 1927 "Dream and Wonder" team. He was a consensus All-American in 1927.

Professional football
He then played professional football in the National Football League (NFL), first for the Green Bay Packers, including the World Championship teams of 1929, 1930, and 1931. He was named All-Pro while at Green Bay in 1932. He finished his professional career with the Brooklyn Dodgers.

Baseball
He also played Double A and Triple A baseball.

Later life
After completing his professional career, he returned to his hometown of Washington, Georgia, where he was an automobile dealer and later elementary school principal and coach, mentoring many young men in that community. From 1943 to 1945, he was an assistant football coach at the University of Georgia under Coach Wally Butts. He was named to the 1934 University of Georgia All-Time team. He was also inducted into the state of Georgia Sports Hall of Fame in 1972 and the Washington-Wilkes Sports Hall of Fame in its inaugural induction in 1987. His son, Thomas Nash Jr. followed in his father's footsteps and played football as an offensive tackle  for the University of Georgia from 1968-1971. "Little Tom" was an Academic All-American and named to the All-SEC Team during his time at Georgia.

References

External links
 
 

1905 births
1972 deaths
American football ends
Brooklyn Dodgers (NFL) players
Georgia Bulldogs football players
Green Bay Packers players
All-American college football players
All-Southern college football players
People from Lincoln County, Georgia
People from Washington, Georgia
Players of American football from Georgia (U.S. state)